The 1912 Marquette Blue and Gold football team represented the Marquette University as an independent during the 1912 college football season. Led by Clarence Kenney in his first and only season as head coach, Marquette compiled a record of 3–4.

Schedule

References

Marquette
Marquette Golden Avalanche football seasons
Marquette Blue and Gold football